"Even Heaven Cries" is a pop ballad recorded by German pop trio Monrose. It was penned by Robbie Nevil, Lauren Evans, Philip Denker, Jonas Jeberg, and Jens Lumholt for the group's debut studio album, Temptation (2006). Produced by Jeberg, the song was released as the album's second single on 2 March 2007 (see 2007 in music) in German-speaking Europe.

The track reached the top 10 in Germany and Slovenia and the top 20 in Austria and Switzerland. It also served as Monrose's competition song for the Grand Prix Vorentscheid, the pre-selection show of the 52nd Eurovision Song Contest 2007, where it eventually placed second with a total of 20 per cent of all 900,000 phone votes.

Writing and recording 
Commissioned by the band's A&R manager Nik Hafemann, "Even Heaven Cries" was one of the first songs on Temptation to be recorded by all six Popstars finalists during the album sessions in late October 2006. An early draft of the song was premiered by subsequent band member Mandy Capristo and Popstars finalists Katarzyna "Kati" Zinkiewicz and Romina Reinhardt in a one-time live version, specially-produced for the second last episode of the Popstars series on 16 November 2006; however, this version featured different ad-libs and vocal harmonies from the one on the album. In the final episode of the show the song was staged again in various variants but also without being advertised as Monrose's second single then.

In January 2007, it was announced that either "Your Love Is Right Over Me," "Even Heaven Cries," or "Push Up on Me" would be the next single and Starwatch started a poll asking the fans to decide. However, "Even Heaven Cries" finished first with 47% of all votes and was eventually chosen as the group's second single. Thus, the song also served as the albums's competition song in the pre-selection show of the 52nd Eurovision Song Contest 2007 but to get a better result than the under deadline pressure mixed album version, the girls re-entered recording studios with Thorsten Brötzmann to re-record several parts of the song. However, the shortened single version of the song world-premiered on the ProSieben network's prime time boxing show ProSieben Fight Night on 16 February 2007.

The final trio has described the track as one of the "most sentimental" records on Temptation: "'Even Heaven Cries' is pure emotion and has always been one of our favourites on the album", Mandy Capristo said in an interview with the band's official website. "This emotional ballad has still become more pathetic through its overwork."  Senna Gammour called the song a personal concern: "It [the song] is a notice to signify to yourself! And that's so absolutely us!"

Music video

The music video for "Even Heaven Cries" was co-directed by Katja Kuhl and Moritz Krebs and entirely shot in Berlin-Spandau in early February 2007. It officially worldpremiered on 22 February on the band's official website, and received its first official airing on the German music television channel VIVA on 23 February. The video, however, was not included into its music video rotation since Popstars broadcaster ProSieben wanted to promote the official video premiere with the start of second cycle of Germany's Next Topmodel on 1 March - almost one week after its initial first airing.

The video shows Monrose in a flowery garden, Bahar Kızıl sitting on a swing while Senna Gammour is standing in front of a cherry tree and Mandy Capristo is shown sitting on a bench. Scenes of two harassed women and one father whose son smudged his apartment with yellow paint are cut in. They seem to despair but then the garden in which Monrose are placed turns out to be a glass globe that encourages the three tormented. The music video plays with two heavy contrasted worlds: On the one hand the glass globe which shows a gaudy fairylike dreamland but on the other hand the grey, drab, depressing world where injustice and grief happens. However the video attempts to convey what the song's lyrics say: There are always ups and downs in life you just have to be loyal to yourself and everything will become fine again.

Chart performance 
Although "Even Heaven Cries" was not officially released until 2 March 2007, it entered the German Download Chart at number 9 in December 2006, based solely on digital downloads whose numbers were pushed by several live performances by the end of the Popstars season. In February 2007 the confirmed single appeared a week early on the German Airplay Chart, debuting at number 36. However, it took another four weeks until the song reached its peak position of number 16 on particular chart.

On 16 March 2007 "Even Heaven Cries" debuted at number 7 in Germany, and number 19 in Austria and Switzerland. The following week the song jumped one spot to number 6 on the German Singles Chart and to number 17 in Austria, mainly due to increasing CD singles and digital sales following Monrose's live performance of the song on the Deutscher Vorentscheid, the pre-selection show for the ESC 2007, on 8 March 2007. Those two formats spawned two previously unreleased songs entitled "Diamonds and Pearls" and "Butt Butt."

Formats and track listings
These are the formats and track listings of major single-releases of "Even Heaven Cries".

 CD single
 "Even Heaven Cries" (single version 2007) – 2:57
 "Diamonds and Pearls" (written by Vincent Degiorgio, Tony Malm) – 3:36
 "Butt Butt" (written by Jasmine Baird, Alex James) – 3:01
 "Even Heaven Cries" (Jeo mix) – 2:55
 "Even Heaven Cries" (single version 2007) (instrumental) – 2:56

 Digital single
 "Even Heaven Cries" (single version 2007) – 2:57
 "Butt Butt" – 3:01
 "Even Heaven Cries" (Jeo mix) – 2:55

Credits and personnel
Credits adapted from the liner notes of Temptation.

Thorsten Brötzmann – production (single version)
Mandy Capristo – vocals 
Philip Denker – writing
Lauren Evans – writing
Senna Gammour – vocals 

Jonas Jeberg – instruments, mixing, production, writing
Bahar Kizil – vocals 
Jens Lumholt – writing
Claudia Macias – artwork
Robbie Nevil – writing

Charts

Weekly charts

Year-end charts

References

External links

 

2006 songs
2007 singles
Monrose songs
Songs written by Robbie Nevil
Songs written by Lauren Evans
Songs written by Jonas Jeberg